Scott M. Ladd (June 22, 1855 – April 14, 1931) was a jurist in the state of Iowa. Born in Sharon, Wisconsin to John Ladd and SarahWillmarth, Ladd graduated from Carthage College then located in Illinois where he met his wife Emma. He then studied at the University of Iowa, where he also graduated from, and was admitted to the Iowa bar. Ladd was a judge in the circuit court from 1887 to 1896. He was a justice of the Iowa Supreme Court from 1897 to 1920. He is the father of Scott Mason Ladd Jr. who acted as Dean of both the University of Iowa College of Law and the Florida State University College of Law. He died in Des Moines, Iowa.

References

People from Sharon, Wisconsin
Politicians from Des Moines, Iowa
Carthage College alumni
University of Iowa alumni
Justices of the Iowa Supreme Court
Iowa state court judges
1855 births
1931 deaths